The Book of Hours of Engelbert of Nassau (Bodleian Library, Oxford, MSS. Douce 219–220) is a book of hours in the Dominican Rite, illuminated by the Master of Mary of Burgundy, which was produced in Ghent in the 1470s or 1480s for Engelbert II of Nassau. It is regarded as one of the high-points of Flemish manuscript illumination.

References

External links
 Ms Douce 219, Bodleian website.
 Ms Douce 220, Bodleian website.
 MSS Douce 219-20 In the Bodleian Libraries' Catalogue of Medieval Manuscripts

15th-century illuminated manuscripts
Bodleian Library collection
Engelbert of Nassau
Liège